Liliana Ivanova Kostova (Bulgarian: Лиляна Костова Иванова, born 15 March 1988) is a formere Bulgarian football midfielder. She played for Apollon Limassol in Cyprus' First Division, Super Sport Sofia, with whom she first played the UEFA Women's Cup, and FK Khimki and Nadezhda Noginsk of Russia's Championship. and for Fiorentina in the Italian women's Serie A

She was a member of the Bulgarian national team.

References

External links

1988 births
Living people
Bulgarian women's footballers
Bulgaria women's international footballers
Bulgarian expatriate footballers
Expatriate women's footballers in Russia
Nadezhda Noginsk players
Expatriate women's footballers in Cyprus
Apollon Ladies F.C. players
Expatriate women's footballers in Poland
Medyk Konin players
Women's association football forwards
Fiorentina Women's F.C. players
KKS Czarni Sosnowiec players
FC NSA Sofia players
Expatriate women's footballers in Italy
Bulgarian expatriate sportspeople in Italy
A.S.D. AGSM Verona F.C. players
LP Super Sport Sofia players